General Dynamics Land Systems–Australia (GDLS-Australia or GDLS-A) provides engineering, manufacturing, systems integration, upgrade and fleet management services for GDLS Armoured Fighting Vehicles in the Asia Pacific region. In Australia this includes the ADF's ASLAV Light Armoured Vehicles and M1A1 Main Battle Tanks, supported under a Through Life Support Contract awarded in June 2011.

GDLS-A reports operationally to General Dynamics Land Systems–Canada (GDLS-C) a wholly owned subsidiary of General Dynamics.

General Dynamics Land Systems–Australia (GDLS-A), formerly General Motors Defence Australia, was established in October 2000, as a result of the sale of all General Motors Defense operations worldwide to General Dynamics Land Systems in March 2003. 

GDLS-A was established as a result of GDLS-C being awarded the Phase III contract to provide 144 Australian Light Armoured Vehicles (ASLAV) to the Commonwealth of Australia. The contract provided for the manufacture of the LAV-25 turret system in Adelaide and the establishment of a significant Australian supplier base to support manufacturing for GDLS' global supply chain for LAV-25 turrets.

GDLS-A’s primary customer is the Defence Materiel Organisation, Commonwealth of Australia, located in Melbourne, Victoria.
 
GDLS-A's National Manufacturing and Support Centre is located north of Adelaide in Pooraka. GDLS-A also has Field Service Groups in Darwin and Brisbane, and a Fleet Management Services office in Southbank, Melbourne.

External links
General Dynamics Land Systems Australia Website
General Dynamics Land Systems-Canada Website

Defence companies of Australia
Motor vehicle manufacturers of Australia